Tsugumomo is an anime series adapted from the manga, written by Yoshikazu Hamada. The series is directed and written by Ryōichi Kuraya at Zero-G. Yasuharu Takanashi composed the music at Pony Canyon. The first season aired from April 3 to June 19, 2017 on Animax, Tokyo MX and BS11. The series ran for 12 episodes. Crunchyroll licensed the first season and streamed it in North America, Latin America, Australia, New Zealand, South Africa, Europe, the Middle East, and North Africa. While Funimation dubbed it and released it on home video in North America. 

A second season titled Tsugu Tsugumomo, aired from April 5 to June 21, 2020. An 20-minute original video animation was also produced through crowdfunding. It was bundled with the manga's 24th volume, which was released on January 22, 2020.


Episode list

Tsugumomo (Season 1)

Tsugu Tsugumomo (Season 2)

Notes

References

Tsugumomo